Henry Rinklin (born 15 September 1957) is a German former professional track and road cyclist.

Major results

Track

1975
 1st  Points race, UCI Junior Track World Championships
1977
 2nd  Team pursuit, UCI Amateur Track World Championships
1982
 1st Six Days of Dortmund (with Danny Clark
1983
 3rd  Madison, European Track Championships
1984
 3rd  Points race, UCI Track World Championships
 3rd  Madison, European Track Championships
1985
 1st Six Days of Stuttgart (with Josef Kristen)

Road
1981
 2nd Züri-Metzgete
 3rd Overall Tour d'Indre-et-Loire
 7th GP du canton d'Argovie
 9th Grand Prix Cerami
1982
 1st Stage 4 Deutschland Tour
1984
 1st Overall Coca-Cola Trophy

References

External links
 

1957 births
Living people
German male cyclists
German track cyclists
People from Tuttlingen
Sportspeople from Freiburg (region)
Cyclists from Baden-Württemberg